Alison Saar (born February 5, 1956) is a Los Angeles, California based sculptor, mixed-media, and installation artist. Her artwork focuses on the African diaspora and black female identity and is influenced by African, Caribbean, and Latin American folk art and spirituality. Saar is well known for "transforming found objects to reflect themes of cultural and social identity, history, and religion."

Early life and education 
Saar was born in Los Angeles, California, to a well-known African-American sculptor and installation artist, Betye Saar, and Richard Saar, a ceramicist and art conservator.  Saar's mother Betye was involved in the 1970s Black Arts Movement and frequently took Alison and her sisters, Lezley and Tracye, to museums and art openings during their childhood. They also saw Outsider Art, such as Simon Rodia's Watts Towers in Los Angeles and Grandma Prisbrey's Bottle Village in Simi Valley. Saar's love of nature, intense interest in vernacular folk art and admiration of artists' ability to create beauty through the use of discarded items stemmed from her upbringing and exposure to these experiences and types of art. Alison worked with her father as a conservator for eight years, starting while she was still in high school.  This is where she learned to carve, and she notes that it later influenced the materials she would use in her pieces. Dealing with artifacts from different culturesChinese frescoes, Egyptian mummies, and Pre-Columbian and African arttaught Alison about properties of various materials, techniques, and aesthetics.

Saar received a dual degree in art history and studio art from Scripps College (Claremont, CA) in 1978, having studied with Dr. Samella Lewis.  Her thesis focused on African-American folk art.  She received an MFA from Otis College of Art and Design (Los Angeles, CA) in 1981. In addition to their distinguished separate careers Saar and her mother Betye Saar have produced artworks together. From her mother Alison "inherited a fascination with mysticism, found objects, and the spiritual potential of art."

Work 

Saar is skilled in numerous artistic mediums, including metal sculpture, wood, fresco, woodblock print, and works using found objects.  Her sculptures and installations explore themes of African cultural diaspora and spirituality. Her work is often autobiographical and often acknowledges the historical role of the body as a marker of identity, and the body's connection to contemporary identity politics.  Snake Man, in the collection of the Honolulu Museum of Art, is an example of how the artist references both African culture and the human body in her work.  The artist's multiethnic upbringing, multiracial identity and her studies of Latin American, Caribbean and African art and religion have informed her work. Her highly personal, often life-sized sculptures are marked by their emotional candor, and by contrasting materials and messages she imbues her work with a high degree of cultural subtext. Her sculptures represent issues relating to gender and race through both her personal experience and historical context. Saar investigates practices of Candomblé, Santería, and Hoodoo. Believing that objects contain spirits, she transforms familiar found objects to stir human emotions.

In a review of the Whitney Biennial, New York Times art critic Roberta Smith said that Saar's work was among the "few instances where the political and visual join forces with real effectiveness." Of Saar's 2006 exhibition Coup, critic Rebecca Epstein wrote, “[Saar] demonstrates deft skill with seemingly unforgiving materials (bronze, lead, tar, wood). [She] juggles themes of personal and cultural identity as she fashions various sizes of female bodies (often her own) that are buoyant with story while solid in stance.”

Exhibitions 
Saar's work has been exhibited in museums, biennials, galleries, and public art venues. Saar's work has been exhibited internationally with key exhibitions at the UCLA Fowler Museum of Cultural History, L.A. Louver Gallery, Phyllis Kind Gallery in New York City, Ben Maltz Gallery, and Pasadena Museum of California Art. She was an artist-in-residence at Dartmouth College and at The Studio Museum in Harlem. Her solo institutional exhibitions include: Alison Saar: Bearing at the Museum of the African Diaspora in 2015-16; Winter at The Fields Sculpture Park, Omi International Arts Center in 2014-15; Hothouse at the Watts Towers Art Center in 2014-15; and STILL... that opened at the Ben Maltz Gallery, Otis College of Art and Design in 2012 and traveled to the Figge Art Museum, Massachusetts College of Art and Design in 2013.

Significant group exhibitions include: In Profile: Portraits from the Permanent Collection at The Studio Museum in Harlem in 2015; African American Art since 1950: Perspectives from the David C. Driskell Center, a traveling exhibition and catalogue that was presented at the University of Maryland in 2012, Taft Museum of Art in 2013, Harvey B. Gantt Center in 2014, Figge Art Museum in 2014-15, Polk Museum of Art in 2015, and Sheldon Museum of Art in 2016. Made in California: Art, Image, and Identity, 1900-2000 a large survey exhibition and catalogue produced Los Angeles County Museum of Art in 2000; Twentieth Century American Sculpture in the White House Garden at The White House, Washington, D.C., in 1995; and "Building on the Legacy: African American Art from the Permanent Collection" at the Muscarelle Museum of Art in Williamsburg, Virginia in 2018. In 2021, Saar curated SeenUNseen at L.A. Louver which coincided with a reading by Myriam J. A. Chancy.

Saar's work Hi, Yella was included in the 1993 Whitney Biennial held at the Whitney Museum of American Art, a benchmark in American exhibitions for its critical tone and content.

In 2021, the Benton Museum of Art and Armory Center for the Arts surveyed her work in a joint exhibition titled "Alison Saar: Of Aether and Earthe".

Saar is represented by L.A. Louver in Venice, California.

Awards 

 1984: Artist Fellowship, National Endowment for the Arts; Artist in Residence, The Studio Museum in Harlem, New York City, New York
 1985: Engelhard Award, Institute of Contemporary Art, Boston, MA; Artist in Residence, Roswell Museum of Art, Roswell, N.M; Artist, Fellowship, National Endowment for the Arts
 1986: Artist in Residence, November, Washington Project for the Arts
 1988: Artist Fellowship, National Endowment for the Arts
 1989: Guggenheim Fellowship from the John Simon Guggenheim Memorial Foundation
 1998: Joan Mitchell Foundation Award, New Orleans, LA
 1998: Augustus St. Gaudens Memorial Foundation, Cornish, NH
 1999: Distinguished Alumnus of the Year, Otis College of Art and Design, Los Angeles, CA
 2000: Flintridge Foundation Awards for Visual Arts, Pasadena, CA
 2003: Distinguished Alumna Award, Scripps College, Claremont, CA; Artist in residence, Hopkins Center, Dartmouth College, Hanover, New Hampshire
 2004: Received the COLA Grant, Los Angeles, CA
 2005: Excellence in Design Award by the New York City Art Commission, New York City, New York
 2012: Fellow of United States Artists.
 2013: Joan Mitchell Foundation, New York
 City of Los Angeles (C.O.L.A.) Artist Fellowship

Collections 
 Museum of Modern Art, New York
 Indianapolis Museum of Art, Indianapolis, IN
 Museum of Fine Arts, Houston, TX
 Brooklyn Museum, Brooklyn, NY

Publications 
 Shepherd, Elizabeth. Secrets, Dialogues, Revelations: The Art of Betye and Alison Saar. Los Angeles, CA: Wight Art Gallery, University of California, 1990.
 Wilson, Judith. "Down to the Crossroads: The Art of Alison Saar." In Callaloo 14 no 1 (Winter 1991): 107–123.
 Krane, Susan. Art at the Edge, Alison Saar: Fertile Ground, Atlanta, GA: High Museum of Art, 1993.
 Nooter Roberts, Mary, and Alison Saar. Body Politics:The Female Image in Luba Art and the Sculpture of Alison Saar. UCLA Fowler Museum of Cultural History, 2000.
 McGee, Julie L. "Field, Boll, and Monument: Toward an Iconography of Cotton in African American Art." In International Review of African American Art 19 no. 1 (2003): 37–48.
 Lewis, Samella S. African American Art and Artists, revised and expanded 3rd ed., Berkeley: University of California Press, 2003.
 Farrington, Lisa E. "Reinventing Herself: The Black Female Nude." In Woman's Art Journal 24 no. 2 (Autumn 2003–Winter 2004): 15–23.
 Dallow, Jessica. "Reclaiming Histories: Betye and Alison Saar, Feminism, and the Representation of Black Womanhood." Feminist Studies 30 no. 1 (2004): 75–113.
 Dallow, Jessica. Family Legacies: The Art of Betye, Lezley, and Alison Saar. Chapel Hill: Ackland Art Museum, the University of North Carolina at Chapel Hill in association with University of Washington Press, 2005.
 Jones, Leisha. "Women and Abjection: Margins of Difference, Bodies of Art." Visual Culture & Gender 2 (2007): 62–71.
 Linton, Meg. Alison Saar: STILL .... Los Angeles, CA: Otis College of Art and Design, Ben Maltz Gallery, 2012.
 Dallow, Jessica. "Departures and Returns: Figuring the Mother's Body in the Art of Betye and Alison Saar." Reconciling Art and Mothering, edited by Rachel Epp Buller. Ashgate Publishing Company, 2012.

See also

 York: Terra Incognita (2010), Lewis & Clark College, Portland, Oregon

References

External links 
 L.A. Louver Gallery
 New York Foundation for the Arts: Interview with Alison Saar
 2009 Half-Hour TV Interview on The Creative Community
 KCRW Art Talk with Edward Goldman, "The Painful Beauty of Alison Saar's Stories," 2012
 Artists - Alison Saar at Phyllis Kind Gallery (NYC) web site

1956 births
Living people
20th-century American women artists
African-American contemporary artists
American contemporary artists
American women installation artists
American women printmakers
American women sculptors
Sculptors from California
American installation artists
Otis College of Art and Design alumni
Scripps College alumni
21st-century American women artists
African-American sculptors
African-American printmakers